Dochmiac (from δόχμιος 'across, aslant, oblique', or 'pertaining to a δοχμή or hand's-breath') is a poetic meter that is characteristically used in Greek tragedy, expressing extreme agitation or distress. They appear in every extant tragedy—N.C. Conomis counted a total of 1985 in the tragedies of Aeschylus (528×), Sophocles 291×), and Euripides (1166×)—, but there are also examples in satyric drama and Aristophanes, where they are often paratragic in tone and impassioned.

Metrical scheme 
The base metrical scheme is: ‿ — — ‿ —, although any of the long syllables may be resolved (i.e., replaced by two shorts) and either of the two shorts may be replaced by a long (drag-in where the first is replaced, drag-out where the second is replaced, and double drag where both are replaced). Thus, in theory, 32 variants are possible, ranging from five longs — — — — — to eight shorts, ‿ ‿‿ ‿‿ ‿ ‿‿. The ones occurring most often are

 ‿ — — ‿ —,
 ‿ ‿‿ — ‿ —, and
 — ‿‿ — ‿ —.

Examples 
Here is an example from Aeschylus' Seven against Thebes, lines 697-700, where the chorus in vain tries to withhold Oedipus' son Eteocles from a fatal battle with his brother Polynices. The first three lines here are pairs of — ‿‿ — ‿ — dochmiacs. Long syllables have been underlined. (The fourth line is a hagesichorean.) Note that dochmiacs and even whole lines can start and end in the middle of a word:

 
 
 
 
 | – u u – u – | – u u – u – |
 | – u u – u – | – u u – – – |
 | – u u – u – | – u u – u – |
 | u – – u – | u – – ||
 No, don't you be excited; you won't be called a coward,
 since you have prospered in life; but will not the black-shielded
 Erinys (Avenging Spirit) leave your house, when from your hands
 the gods will receive a sacrificial offering?

An example of the simplest double drag form (— — — — —) is when the chorus in Aeschylus' Suppliant Maidens, lines 892 and 901, twice sighs:

 
 
 | – – – – – |
 O Father, Earth's son, Zeus!

References

Types of verses
Ancient Greek theatre